The Wiwa- family lawsuits against Royal Dutch Shell were three separate lawsuits brought in 1996 by the family of Ken Saro-Wiwa against Royal Dutch Shell, its subsidiary Shell Nigeria and the subsidiary's CEO Brian Anderson. Charges included human rights abuses against the Ogoni people in the Niger Delta, summary execution, torture, arbitrary arrest, and wrongful death. After 12 years of Shell petitioning the court not to hear the cases, they were heard 26 May 2009.

On June 8, 2009, Shell settled out-of-court with the Saro-Wiwa family for $15.5 million.

Background 
The particular incidents raised in these cases were:
the 1995 judicial hangings of the Ogoni Nine, leaders of the Movement for the Survival of the Ogoni People (MOSOP);
the torture and detention of Owens Wiwa and Michael Tema Vizor;
the shooting of a woman, Karololo Kogbara, who was peacefully protesting the bulldozing of her crops in preparation for a Shell pipeline, and another female protester, Uebari N-nahby by Nigerian troops allegedly called in by Shell.

American photojournalist Ed Kashi's images from the book Curse of the Black Gold: 50 Years of Oil in the Niger Delta were deposed as evidence of the human rights abuses that the oil industry, particularly Shell, has inflicted on the Ogoni people.

Case 
The lawsuit was filed in 1996 in the United States District Court for the Southern District of New York, and charges were made under the Alien Tort Statute, the Torture Victim Protection Act of 1992 and Racketeer Influenced and Corrupt Organizations Act (RICO). Plaintiffs were charged with complicity in human rights abuses against the Ogoni people in the Niger Delta, including summary execution, crimes against humanity, torture, inhumane treatment, arbitrary arrest, wrongful death, and assault and battery. The lawsuits were filed by the Center for Constitutional Rights (CCR) and co-counsel from EarthRights International.

Resolution 
On June 8, 2009, Shell settled out-of-court with the Saro-Wiwa family for $15.5 million. Ben Amunwa, director of the Remember Saro-Wiwa organization, said that "No company, that is innocent of any involvement with the Nigeria military and human rights abuses, would settle out of court for 15.5 million dollars. It clearly shows that they have something to hide".

Shell stated the payment was a humanitarian gesture and a gesture of sympathy, denying culpability in the death of Ken Saro-Wiwa and the deaths of the Ogoni Nine.

See also 
 Bowoto v. Chevron Corp.
 Kiobel v. Royal Dutch Petroleum Co.

References

External links
 BBC report on case
 BBC report on background to case
Wiwa v. Shell - Official website (joint project of the Center for Constitutional Rights and EarthRights International)
 Center for Constitutional Rights
 EarthRights International
 Correspondence between Shell and the Nigeria Police
 Why I'm Suing Shell, article by Ken Wiwa (son of Saro-Wiwa)
 Royal Dutch Shell to go to Trial for Complicity in Torture and Murder of Nigerian Protesters
 Selection of Court documents for pending trial
ShellGuilty coalition (archived at Wayback Machine 2010-06-30

2009 in United States case law
Alien Tort Statute case law
Niger River Delta
Nigeria–United States relations
Ogoni people
Royal Dutch Shell litigation
Ken Saro-Wiwa